Mohamed Abdellahi Soudani Dicko (born 17 September 1995) is a Mauritanian international footballer who plays as a striker.

Club career
Born in Nouadhibou, he has played club football for FC Nouadhibou, Stade Tunisien, US Tataouine, Al-Watani, AS Gabès, DRB Tadjenanet and Al-Lewaa.

On 8 October 2021, Al-Lewaa has signed Soudani for one seasons from FC Nouadhibou.

International career
He made his international debut for Mauritania in 2015.

References

1995 births
Living people
Mauritanian footballers
Mauritania international footballers
FC Nouadhibou players
Stade Tunisien players
US Tataouine players
Al-Watani Club players
AS Gabès players
DRB Tadjenanet players
Al-Lewaa Club players
Tunisian Ligue Professionnelle 1 players
Saudi First Division League players
Algerian Ligue Professionnelle 1 players
Saudi Second Division players
Association football forwards
Mauritanian expatriate footballers
Mauritanian expatriate sportspeople in Tunisia
Expatriate footballers in Tunisia
Mauritanian expatriate sportspeople in Saudi Arabia
Expatriate footballers in Saudi Arabia
Mauritanian expatriate sportspeople in Algeria
Expatriate footballers in Algeria